Ndaziona Chatsalira (born 8 November 1992) is a Malawian football midfielder who currently plays for ENH de Vilankulo.

References

1992 births
Living people
Malawian footballers
Malawi international footballers
ESCOM United FC players
Silver Strikers FC players
Clube Ferroviário de Nampula players
Clube Ferroviário de Nacala players
Vilankulo F.C. players
Association football midfielders
Malawian expatriate footballers
Expatriate footballers in Mozambique
Malawian expatriate sportspeople in Mozambique